U-42 may refer to one of the following German submarines:

  was ordered from Fiat-Laurenti for observation of competitive technologies; never delivered to Germany due to outbreak of war; served in Italian Navy as Balilla from 1915; sunk in July 1916 off the island of Lissa
 During the First World War, Germany also had these submarines with similar names:
 , a Type UB II submarine launched in 1916 and surrendered on 16 November 1918
 , a Type UC II submarine launched in 1916 and sunk on 10 September 1917
 , a Type IX submarine that served in the Second World War until sunk on 13 October 1939

Submarines of Germany